Herbert John "Jack" Shelton (21 January 1924 – 1 June 2006) was an Australian cricketer. He played three first-class matches for Tasmania between 1951 and 1957.

Military service
He served in the Army, as Private, in the Army Ordnance Workshops (9 March 1942 – 12 June 1942); and, at 18 years, 5 months, upon transfer to the Royal Australian Air Force, as a Warrant Officer, Royal Australian Air Force (19 June 1942 – 26 October 1945).

Cricket
He played for Tasmania against the M.C.C. touring team in Hobart on 13 January 1951, and a week later, in Launceston, on 19 January 1951. He also played for Tasmania, against Victoria, at St Kilda Cricket Ground, on 22 January 1957.

See also
 List of Tasmanian representative cricketers

Footnotes

References
 Shelton Outstanding Cricketer All-Rounder, The (Launceston) Examiner, (Wednesday, 2 January 1951), p,14.
 Military Service Record: Herbert John Shelton (408470).
 Smith, Rick, Lest We Forget: Tasmania's Cricketing Soldiers, (Prospect), 2007.

External links
 

1924 births
2006 deaths
Australian Army personnel of World War II
Australian Army soldiers
Australian cricketers
Cricketers from Launceston, Tasmania
Royal Australian Air Force airmen
Royal Australian Air Force personnel of World War II
Tasmania cricketers